Yermakovsky (masculine), Yermakovskaya (feminine), or Yermakovskoye (neuter) is the name of several rural localities in Russia:
Yermakovsky, Novosibirsk Oblast, a settlement in Kochkovsky District of Novosibirsk Oblast
Yermakovsky, name of several other rural localities
Yermakovskaya, a stanitsa in Tatsinsky District of Rostov Oblast
Yermakovskoye, a selo in Yermakovsky District of Krasnoyarsk Krai
Yermakovsky District, a district in Russia
Yermakovsky mine, a mine in Russia